The Electoral College of the Holy Roman Empire was the gathering of prince electors for an imperial election, where they voted for the next King of the Romans and future Emperor. The German name of this gathering, Kur, is derived from the Middle High German kur or kure ("election").

Initially all the so-called "great ones of the Empire" (Große des Reiches) were entitled to vote, but by the second half of the 13th century, only the prince electors were entitled to participate in the royal election.

Literature 
 

Imperial election (Holy Roman Empire)